Jonathan Hughes is a British [Orthodox] rabbi at Radlett Synagogue in Hertfordshire, England. From 2013 to 2015 he was rabbi at Richmond Synagogue in Richmond, London. Previously an associate rabbi at Hendon United Synagogue, he is a law graduate and a former Reading Football Club player. In May 2022, Hughes was appointed Jewish Chaplain at Harrow School. In November 2022, Hughes announced that he would be leaving the rabbinate to found and lead The Abraham Effect, an organisation dedicated to promoting Jewish identity and education for Jewish pupils attending U.K. secondary schools. 

Years as a rabbi-

Hendon United Synagogue(associate)   2011-2013 

Richmond Synagogue 2013-2015

Radlett United Synagogue 2015-

References

Living people
English Orthodox Jews
Modern Orthodox rabbis
Reading F.C. players
People from Radlett
Association footballers not categorized by position
Year of birth missing (living people)
English footballers